Francisc Vaștag (born 26 November 1969) is a retired Romanian amateur boxer, who won three world amateur titles between 1989 and 1995, in the welterweight and light middleweight categories. He competed at the 1988, 1992 and 1996 Olympics reaching quarterfinals in 1992. After retiring from competitions he coached the national boxing team. His son, Andrei Vaștag, is a football player who played for Liga I side FC Dinamo București, among other teams.

References

External links
Francisc Vaștag profile at Boxrec.com
1988 Romanian National Championships
1989 Romanian National Championships
1990 Romanian National Championships
1991 Romanian National Championships
1993 Romanian National Championships
1996 Romanian National Championships

1969 births
Living people
Sportspeople from Reșița
Boxers at the 1988 Summer Olympics
Boxers at the 1992 Summer Olympics
Boxers at the 1996 Summer Olympics
Olympic boxers of Romania
Romanian male boxers
AIBA World Boxing Championships medalists
Welterweight boxers